The European Journal of Nutrition is a peer-reviewed medical journal covering nutrition science. It was established in 1960 as Zeitschrift für Ernährungswissenschaft, obtaining its current name in 1999. It is published eight times per year by Springer Science+Business Media and the editor-in-chief is Bruce Griffin (University of Surrey). According to the Journal Citation Reports, the journal has a 2018 impact factor of 4.449. The Journal is included in the Index Medicus and in MEDLINE.

References

External links

Springer Science+Business Media academic journals
Publications established in 1960
Nutrition and dietetics journals
English-language journals